Négrondes is a commune in the Dordogne department in Nouvelle-Aquitaine in southwestern France. Négrondes station has rail connections to Bordeaux, Périgueux and Limoges.

Population

See also
Communes of the Dordogne department

References

Communes of Dordogne